John Telemachus Johnson (October 5, 1788 – December 17, 1856) was a minister in the Christian Church, an attorney, and a politician, elected as U.S. Representative from Kentucky. His older brothers, also politicians, included James Johnson and Richard M. Johnson, who served as Vice President under Martin Van Buren; he was the uncle of Robert Ward Johnson, also a politician.

Early life and education
Born at Great Crossings, in present-day Scott County, Kentucky, Johnson pursued preparatory studies after being home schooled. He attended Transylvania University, in Lexington, Kentucky.

Like his older brother Richard, he studied law. He was admitted to the bar in 1809 and commenced practice in Georgetown, Kentucky. He owned slaves. Johnson served in the Kentucky Militia during the War of 1812 as an aide-de-camp to General William H. Harrison.

Political career
Johnson was elected as a member of the Kentucky House of Representatives, serving for five terms.

He was elected in 1820 as a Democratic-Republican to the Seventeenth Congress and reelected as a Jackson Democrat to the Eighteenth Congress (March 4, 1821 – March 3, 1825). While in Congress, Johnson served as chairman of the Committee on the Post Office and Post Roads (Eighteenth Congress). He declined to run in 1824.

He was appointed judge of the Kentucky Court of Appeals April 20, 1826, and served until December 30, 1826.

Johnson was ordained as a minister of the Christian Church, where he served for a number of years. He became active in publishing Christian journalism. He became editor of the Christian Messenger in 1832, the Gospel Advocate in 1835, and the Christian in 1837.

In 1836, Johnson was instrumental in establishing Bacon College at Georgetown, Kentucky.

He died in Lexington, Missouri, December 17, 1856. He was interred at Lexington Cemetery.

See also

 The Family (Arkansas politics)
 Shropshire House

References

External links
 

1788 births
1856 deaths
People from Scott County, Kentucky
Richard Mentor Johnson family
American people of Scottish descent
American members of the Churches of Christ
Democratic-Republican Party members of the United States House of Representatives from Kentucky
Members of the Kentucky House of Representatives
Judges of the Kentucky Court of Appeals
Kentucky lawyers
American slave owners
Restoration Movement
19th-century American judges
Transylvania University alumni
American militiamen in the War of 1812